Jan T. Vilček (born June 17, 1933) is a biomedical scientist, educator, inventor and philanthropist. He is a professor in the department of microbiology at the New York University School of Medicine, and chairman and CEO of The Vilcek Foundation.
Vilček, a native of Bratislava, Slovakia, (then part of Czechoslovakia) received his M.D. degree from Comenius University Medical School, Bratislava in 1957; and his Ph.D. in Virology from the Institute of Virology, Czechoslovak Academy of Sciences, Bratislava, Czechoslovakia in 1962.  In 1964, Vilček, with his wife Marica, defected from Communist Czechoslovakia during a three-day visit to Vienna. In 1965, the Vilčeks immigrated to the United States, and have since lived in New York City. Vilček devoted his scientific career to studies of soluble mediators that regulate the immune system (cytokines), including interferon and tumor necrosis factor (TNF).

Early years
Vilček was born in Bratislava, Czechoslovakia, to a middle class secular Jewish family. His mother, Friderika Fischer, was born to a German-speaking family in Budapest, Hungary. She moved with her family to Bratislava where she finished medical school, married Jan's father, Julius Vilček, and became an ophthalmologist. Jan grew up speaking three languages (Slovak, German and Hungarian). During the Second World War, his family was persecuted because of their Jewish heritage. To protect him from deportation to a concentration camp, in 1942 his parents placed Jan in an orphanage run by Catholic nuns. From mid-1944 through the end of the war in 1945, Vilček and his mother were hidden by a Slovak family in a remote village, while his father joined an uprising against the Nazis. After the defeat of Nazi Germany the family was reunited and moved back to Bratislava.

Career and scientific contributions

Vilček became interested in research in microbiology and immunology during his medical studies. Upon completing medical school in 1957, Vilček joined the Institute of Virology, Czechoslovak Academy of Sciences in Bratislava as a research scientist. There, in 1959, he embarked on studies of interferon, a protein made in response to infection with viruses and other pathogens. At the time, interferon was still a poorly defined protein studied by only a handful of scientists across the world. In 1964, Vilček organized the first international conference on interferon that was attended by many scientists active in the field at the time.  Upon emigrating to the United States in 1965, Vilček joined the faculty of NYU School of Medicine as an assistant professor of microbiology. At NYU, Vilček continued research on interferon. He helped to develop methods for the production of human fibroblast (beta) interferon that enabled its clinical utilization and molecular characterization. He and his colleagues showed that human leukocyte (alpha) and beta interferon are antigenically distinct, laying the groundwork for the later demonstration that these interferons are encoded by distinct genes that belong to the same gene family. He and his coworkers also contributed to the characterization of human immune (gamma) interferon. In the 1980s Vilček became interested in the study of another cytokine, termed tumor necrosis factor (TNF). His work helped to elucidate novel biological actions of TNF, led to the discovery of novel genes and proteins, and helped to identify signaling pathways.

Over the span of his career, Vilček published over 350 papers in scientific journals. Vilček is an Institute for Scientific Information highly cited researcher in the Immunology category. He is listed as an inventor on over 40 US patents.

Contributions to drug development

In the 1970s Vilček and colleagues developed methods for the production of human interferon-beta in cultures of human diploid fibroblasts. These methods made it possible to produce natural human interferon-beta for clinical trials. Interferon-beta produced by these methods was licensed for clinical use in multiple sclerosis and some other diseases in Germany and in Japan, but eventually the production of natural interferon has been replaced by more efficient methods utilizing recombinant DNA technology.

In 1989 Vilček and NYU colleague, Junming Le, created a monoclonal antibody against TNF-alpha, a powerful promoter of inflammation. TNF-alpha is involved in the pathogenesis of numerous chronic inflammatory autoimmune diseases. Collaborating with the biotechnology company Centocor, founded by Michael Wall and Hubert Schoemaker (later acquired by Johnson & Johnson and recently renamed Janssen Biotech, Inc.), Vilček and Le helped to develop the biologic drug initially termed cA2, which is now known commercially as infliximab, or Remicade. Remicade is a potent anti-inflammatory agent used in the treatment of rheumatoid arthritis, Crohn's disease, ulcerative colitis, ankylosing spondylitis, psoriatic arthritis, plaque psoriasis and other inflammatory diseases.

Remicade was the first TNF blocking agent successfully used in patients. The success of Remicade spurred the development and regulatory approval of several other anti-TNF agents (TNF inhibitor), including adalimumab-Humira, etanercept-Enbrel, golimumab-Simponi, and certolizumab pegol-Cimzia, all of which are being used to treat numerous inflammatory autoimmune diseases. It is estimated that close to 3 million patients have been treated with Remicade, and more patients benefited from treatments with other anti-TNF agents.

Philanthropy

With the royalties from the sales of Remicade, Vilček and his wife Marica established the Vilcek Foundation in 2000, devoted to increasing public awareness of the contribution of immigrants to professional, academic and artistic life in the United States.  The foundation fulfills its mission by awarding annual Vilcek Prizes in biomedical science and the arts, sponsoring cultural programs, and hosting immigrant artists in its gallery space in New York City.

In 2005, the Vilčeks made a donation to NYU School of Medicine valued at over 100 million dollars, for use towards basic research. The funds have been used for the establishment of several endowed professorships, renovation of laboratories, establishment of research programs and endowment of fellowships for graduate students and postdoctoral fellows at NYU School of Medicine.

In a separate donation announced in late 2010, the Vilčeks contributed over 21 million dollars for the renovation of a dormitory for medical students and the establishment of endowed merit scholarships for medical students.

Vilček's memoir, Love and Science, was published by Seven Stories Press in 2016. An audiobook version of Love and Science was released in March 2021. The audiobook is narrated by Daniel K. Isaac.

Vilček's wife, Marica Vilcek, an art historian, endowed two curatorships in the American Wing of the Metropolitan Museum of Art. Jan Vilček is a member of the board of trustees of the NYU Langone Medical Center.

Awards and honors
Nancy LaMott Award from Crohn's & Colitis Foundation, 2019
Alpha Omega Alpha Honor Medical Society, 2019
Ellis Island Medal of Honor, 2018
Doctor honoris causa, Charles University, Czech Republic, 2018
 Living Landmarks Award from the New York Landmarks Conservancy (jointly with Marica Vilcek), 2017
 Fellow of the National Academy of Inventors, 2016
 Seymour and Vivian Milstein Award for Excellence in Interferon and Cytokine Research, 2016
 Doctor of Science, honoris causa, Slovak Academy of Sciences, 2016
 Doctor of Science, honoris causa, New York University, 2015
 Doctor of Humane Letters, honoris causa, Graduate Center, City University of New York, 2014
 Gold medal, Charles University in Prague, Czech Republic, 2014
 Hope Funds for Cancer Research: Award of Excellence for Advocacy, 2014
 Doctor honoris causa, Comenius University in Bratislava, Slovakia, 2014
 Honorary Membership, Learned Society of the Czech Republic, 2013
 Edward H. Ahrens, Jr. Award for Patient Oriented Research, Association for Clinical and Translational Science, 2013
 National Medal of Technology and Innovation, awarded by President Barack Obama, 2013
 Outstanding American by Choice Award, United States Citizenship and Immigration Services, 2012
 Stephen K Fischel Distinguished Public Service Award (jointly with Marica Vilcek in behalf of the Vilcek Foundation), American Immigration Council, 2012
 Goodwill Ambassador Award, Slovak Ministry of Foreign Affairs, 2010
 Garnet Immunoglobulin Award, Czech Immunology Society, 2008
 J. E. Purkinje Honorary Medal, Czech Academy of Sciences, 2008
 Honorary Alumnus, New York University School of Medicine, New York University, New York, 2006
 Michael S. Modell Humanitarian Award, Crohn's & Colitis Foundation of America (jointly with Marica Vilcek), 2005
 Albert Gallatin Medal, New York University, 2005
 Included in ISI Highly Cited among most highly cited authors in Immunology category
 Honorary Membership, International Society for Interferon and Cytokine Research, 2003
 Honorary Lifetime Membership Award, International Cytokine Society, 2003
 Biotechnology Achievement Award, NYU School of Medicine, 2002
 Distinguished Alumnus Award and Medal, Comenius University, Bratislava, 2001
 Fellow of the American Association for the Advancement of Science, 1997
 Outstanding Investigator Grant, National Cancer Institute, 1991

References

1933 births
Scientists from Bratislava
Czechoslovak emigrants to the United States
American immunologists
Living people
Czechoslovak defectors
Comenius University alumni